Duck Pond Run is a tributary of the Stony Brook in Mercer County, New Jersey in the United States.

Course
It flows west, crossing Penn Lyle Road and North Post Road before flowing through the Duck Pond Run park. It then crosses Clarksville Road and flows through the West Windsor PL Project. It crosses Route 1 before flowing through the Princeton Country Club.

Sister tributaries
Baldwins Creek
Honey Branch
Lewis Brook
Peters Brook
Stony Brook Branch
Woodsville Brook

See also
List of rivers of New Jersey

References

External links
USGS Coordinates in Google Maps

Rivers of Mercer County, New Jersey
Tributaries of the Raritan River
Rivers of New Jersey